Rabat-les-Trois-Seigneurs is a commune in the Ariège department in the Occitanie region in southwestern France.

Name
The real name of the village is Rabat, but since 1931 the French post office administration has decided that the name has to be labelled as Rabat-les-Trois-Seigneurs to avoid a confusion with the city of Rabat in Morocco. Note that the village was called Rabat since Charlemagne in the 8th century, four centuries before Rabat in Morocco that was founded only in 1150.

The expression "les trois seigneurs" means in French "of the three lords". It is a reference to a mountain called "Le pic des trois seigneurs" that close the Courbière valley in which Rabat is settled. The name come from the fact that three valleys (Courbière, Vicdessos, Couserans) are closed by this peak. As each of the valleys has a different lord, the peak is a place common to three lords and so is called "Peak of the three lords". A legend said that every year in summer, the three lords met on the flat stone at the top of the peak and discussed together.

The inhabitants of Rabat are called Rabatols in Occitan (the historical local language) or Rabatois.

Population

Geography
The village of Rabat is settled in the valley of the Courbière, a mountain river. Most of the 15 km of the river are on the village territory.

History
Man has settled in the valley of the Courbière since more than  years. Many archaeological artifacts from the Magdalenian period have been found in the valley (cavern of Bédheilac).

Sights
Rabat church's older portion was built in the 10th century and has a famous wooden altarpiece.

Personalities
 Corbeyran de Rabat (1321-1402), Hofmeister of Gaston Fébus
 Catherine de Rabat, mistress of Gaston Fébus who had four children with him.

Gallery

See also
Communes of the Ariège department

References

Communes of Ariège (department)